"Broken Clocks" is a song by the American singer SZA. The song was originally released as the first promotional single on June 2, 2017, from her debut studio album, Ctrl. It was later sent to urban contemporary radio as the album's fourth single on January 9, 2018. "Broken Clocks" was written by SZA and producer ThankGod4Cody. It samples "West", which was written by River Tiber, Frank Dukes, and Daniel Caesar and performed by the former. SZA performed the song at the 60th Annual Grammy Awards.

Background
The song was released a week ahead of the album's release, as a promotional single on mainstream music platforms. "Broken Clocks" is a follow-up to the songs "Drew Barrymore" and "Love Galore", both of which were released from SZA's album, Ctrl.

Music video
The music video for "Broken Clocks" was co-directed by SZA and Dave Free, and was released on March 30, 2018. The video features SZA at a summer camp in the wilderness. As the song comes to a close, the camera cuts to SZA as a stripper, lying unconscious on the bathroom floor of a strip club, following an altercation with another woman.

Critical reception
Jon Pareles of The New York Times felt, "'Broken Clocks' enfolds SZA amid blurry keyboard tones and a watery sample of men's voices as she ponders memories of an old romance that still haunts her." Joshua Espinoza of Complex magazine regarded the song as "a mid-tempo cut about optimism and perseverance". Lauren Ziegler of Consequence of Sound opined, "'Broken Clocks' is slinky and laid back, with confidence and suggestiveness/passion  dripping from each note. Though more energetic and pointed than the minimalistic 'Love Galore', it still retains a kind of sleek raspiness so unique to the Top Dawg Entertainment artist's sound." Desire Thompson of Vibe magazine argued that SZA has "proven herself to be a talented storyteller between harmonious melodies" and "finds a creative way to highlight the plight of a topsy-tuvy love" with the release of this song. Adelle Platon of Billboard magazine described the song as "nostalgic", while Navjosh of HipHop-N-More described the song as a "soothing mid tempo ballad which is sure to get numerous plays once you start listening". Darby McNally of Paste magazine said, "'Broken Clocks' is a cool, smooth tune with a hint of modernity, a combination that is beginning to be SZA's calling card." Tom Breihan of Stereogum wrote that the song is "a bit of a departure from the hazy sounds of SZA's past work" and has "gasping synths and trap hi-hat skitters, and puts her breathy, expressive vocals in a more commercial light."

Charts

Weekly charts

Year-end charts

Certifications

Release history

Notes

References

2018 singles
2017 songs
SZA songs
Songs written by SZA
Songs written by Frank Dukes